Acton is a town and area in west London, England, within the London Borough of Ealing.

At the 2011 census, its four wards, East Acton, Acton Central, South Acton and Southfield, had a population of 62,480, a ten-year increase of 8,791 people. North Acton, West Acton, East Acton, South Acton, Acton Green, Acton Town, Acton Vale and Acton Central are all parts of Acton.

Acton means "oak farm" or "farm by oak trees", and is derived from the Old English āc (oak) and tūn (farm). Originally an ancient village, as London expanded, Acton was absorbed into the city. Since 1965, Acton equates to the east of the London Borough of Ealing, though some of East Acton is in the London Borough of Hammersmith and Fulham and a small portion of South Acton is in the London Borough of Hounslow.

Central Acton is synonymous with the hub of commerce and retail on the former main road between London and Oxford (the Uxbridge Road); a reminder of its history is in its inns, which date back in cases to the late Tudor period as stopping places for travellers. Nowadays, the principal route linking London and Oxford (the A40 dual carriageway) bypasses central Acton, but passes through East Acton and North Acton.

Toponymy
Acton's name derives from the Old English words āc (oak) and tūn (enclosed garden, enclosure), meaning "a garden or a field enclosed by oaks". Later, in the Middle Ages tūn became a synonym for "farm" or "farm by oak trees". For several centuries, its name bore the prefix Church (hence Chirche Acton, Churche Acton, etc.) to distinguish it from the separate hamlet of East Acton.

History

Origins

Different phases of prehistoric settlement are marked by a range of finds. It begins with a cluster of Upper Palaeolithic and Mesolithic flint cores, flakes and artefacts mainly to the north of Churchfield Road. Around the Mill Hill Park area, a Neolithic axe, and a group of Bronze Age Deverel-Rimbury urns and cremated bone were found, along with an Iron Age pot shard. Iron Age coins were also found near Bollo Lane. The Roman period is represented by a ditch in the same area, and a hoard north of Springfield Gardens. In the Middle Ages the northern half of the parish was heavily wooded. Oaks and elms still stood along roads and hedgerows and in private grounds in the early 20th century, but most of the woodland had been cleared by the 17th century, even on the extensive Old Oak common.

Medieval era
Landholders figuring in county records were resident by 1222 and houses were recorded from the late 13th century. The main settlement, Church Acton or Acton town, lay slightly west of the centre of the parish along the highway to Oxford (Uxbridge Road) at the 5-mile post out of London. By 1380 some of the tenements, such as The Tabard and The Cock, along the south side of the road, were inns. The hamlet of East Acton, mentioned in 1294, consisted of farmhouses and cottages north and south of common land known as East Acton green by 1474.

Medieval settlement was mainly around the two hamlets. At Church Acton most of the farmhouses lay along the Oxford road or Horn Lane, with only a few outlying farms. Friars Place Farm at the north end of Horn Lane and the moated site to the west, occupied until the 15th century, were early farms. East of Friars Place farm were commons: Worton or Watton Green and Rush green in the 16th and 17th centuries, and Friars Place in the 18th century, where there was some settlement by 1664. To the north-west were Acton or Old Oak wells, known by 1613. In the parish's extreme south, a few farmhouses on the northern side of Acton common or Acton Green were mentioned as in Turnham Green until the 19th century and were linked more closely with that village than with Acton. Gregories, mentioned in 1551 as a copyhold tenement with 30 a. near Bollo Lane and the Brentford high road, probably lay in Acton.

Londoners were increasingly involved in land sales from the early 14th century but apparently did not live in Acton until the late 15th. The manor, part of Fulham, had no resident (demesne) lord, and apart from a brief period before c. 1735, when a branch of the landed Somerset (Duke of Beaufort's) family lived in Acton, there were no large resident landowners. Many of the tenements without land, including most of the inns, frequently changed hands.

Early modern period
The parish had 158 communicants in 1548. In 1664 it had 72 chargeable households and 59 exempt, with 6 empty houses. Six houses had 10 or more hearths, 16 had from 5 to 9, 33 had 3 or 4, 23 had 2, and 53 had 1. Acton had about 160 families resident in the mid 18th century.

By the 17th century Acton's proximity to London had made it a summer retreat for courtiers and lawyers. Sir Richard Sutton bought the seat at East Acton known later as Manor House in 1610 and Sir Henry Garraway probably rebuilt Acton House in 1638. Sir John Trevor MP bought several Acton properties in the mid 17th century, including Berrymead/Berrymede, improving it with a lake and stream, home of George Savile, 1st Marquess of Halifax and his second son after him, and afterwards of the Duke of Kingston-upon-Hull, with a much-praised landscape.

Acton was lauded as "blessed with very sweet air" in 1706 by rector urging a friend in verse to move there. The fashion for medicinal waters brought a brief period of fame, with the exploitation of the wells at Old Oak common, when East Acton and Friars Place were said to be thronged with summer visitors, who had brought about improvement in the houses there. Although high society had left Acton by the mid 18th century, many professional and military men bought houses there, sometimes including a small park, until well into the 19th century. The break-up of the  Fetherstonhaugh estate, which had had no resident owner, produced four or five small estates whose owners, professional men such as Samuel Wegg, John Winter, and Richard White, were active in parish affairs. Grand early homes included: Heathfield Lodge, West Lodge, and East Lodge by Winter c. 1800, Mill Hill House by White, and Woodlands at Acton Hill soon afterwards. Acton Green also became increasingly popular, being near Chiswick High Road (the Great West Road). Fairlawn, substantial, on west side of the green, was the home of the botanist John Lindley (1797–1865) as was the house to the north and Bedford House, another home of Lindley, and Melbourne House further east. A short row of houses had been built on the south side of the green by 1800.

In 1804, Derwentwater House was built in the grounds of Acton House by the Selby family.

19th century development

In 1812, twenty almshouses were built by the Worshipful Company of Goldsmiths on the former Perryn estate, on land which had been left to the company by John Perryn in 1657.

There were 241 inhabited houses in 1801 and 426 by 1831. Growth took place mainly in the established residential neighbourhoods of Acton town and East Acton, but Acton Green also had acquired a cluster of cottages and houses at the bottom of Acton Lane by 1842. Acton was mostly rural in 1831. The few mansions contrasted sharply with most of the houses, which were described as 'beneath mediocrity of character'. Despite an overall rise in the number of houses, poor rates had to be increased in the 1820s because of a growing number of empty dwellings.

More widespread building was planned and took place in the 1850s. As a result of its soft water sources, Acton became famous for its laundries and at the end of the 19th century there were around 170 establishments in South Acton. These laundries would serve hotels and the rich in London's West End, leading to the nickname "Soapsuds Island" or "Soap Sud City". At least 600 different laundries operated within South Acton; the last laundry closed in the late 1970s and is now a low redbrick block of flats.

The parish of Acton formed a local board of health in 1865 and became an urban district in 1894.

In 1895, Acton Cemetery was opened on farmland near to what is now North Acton Station.

20th century
The town was incorporated as the Municipal Borough of Acton in 1921. This authority combined with the municipal boroughs of Ealing and Southall to form the London Borough of Ealing, within Greater London, in 1965. An Acton Golf Club was founded in 1896, which closed in 1920 and the area was redeveloped for housing.

Acton formed an urban district and, later, municipal borough of Middlesex from 1894 to 1965. Its former area was used to form part of the London Borough of Ealing in 1965. During the 20th century Acton was a major industrial centre employing tens of thousands of people, particularly in the motor vehicles and components industries. The industries of North Acton merged with the great industrial concentrations of Park Royal and Harlesden. One of the most important firms was Renault which made cars, including the 4CV and Dauphine, at a factory in North Acton from 1926 until 1960. Renault has remained on the site continuously since the 1920s and still has its main London showroom on the Park Royal site.

Further south Acton Vale had famous names including Napier & Son (engines), H. Bronnley & Co (Soaps), Evershed & Vignoles (electrical equipment), Lucas CAV (automotive electrical), Vandervell Products (bearings), and Wilkinson Sword (swords and razors).

Acton today
Acton is now principally residential, though it maintains some light industry, particularly in the northeast Park Royal area, and the south near the border with Chiswick. Waitrose started in Acton, as Waite, Rose and Taylor - on the High Street near the police station - with its second branch opening in Churchfield Road in 1913.

Acton is home to the largest housing estate in west London, the South Acton estate, with approximately 2,000 homes and 5,800 residents.

Acton will host the starting point of the 25 kilometre Thames Tideway Tunnel (also known as the "Super Sewer") at the Acton Storm Tanks in Canham Road. This will be built to avoid the discharge of sewage from Combined Sewer Overflow into the River Thames.

Leisure
The Acton High Street has a range of pubs which vary in theme and clientele.

The recently refurbished 'Mount' on Acton High Street hosts a Market on Thursday, Friday and Saturday. Visitors can shop at stalls selling a range of produce. Acton's library, swimming baths (built in 1904) and Town Hall are examples of tall Victorian municipal buildings that can be found along the High Street. Acton Swimming Baths closed in December 2011 for a three-year development project, replacing the existing pools with a 25m 8-lane pool and a smaller teaching pool. The site reopened in April 2014
An indoor climbing wall has recently opened on the high street, housed in a building originally constructed in the 1920s as an Art Deco cinema. The building was later used as a bingo hall before being refurbished into the bouldering centre there today.

On the east end of Acton High Street is Acton Park, which features mini golf, bar and pizza restaurant operated by Putt in the Park. The South Eastern corner of the park includes tennis courts, outdoor fitness equipment and a multi-purpose basketball and 5-a-side football court. The park also features a large children's play area including an adventure playground partially created from local trees felled during a storm, a pond, an art block and Acton Skate Park, run by the Ealing Skatepark Association, which opened in April 2019.

Education

Primary schools 
There are six state-funded primary schools in Acton, Berrymede Junior School, Derwentwater Primary School, East Acton Primary School, St Vincent's RC Primary School, West Acton Primary School, West Twyford Primary School. The Ark (charity) has opened two primary academies in Acton, Ark Priory Primary Academy in 2013 and Ark Byron Primary Academy in 2015, the latter is based in Acton Park.

Secondary schools
Acton has three state-funded secondary high schools, Ark Acton Academy, Twyford Church of England High School and The Ellen Wilkinson School for Girls, and an independent school, the Barbara Speake Stage School. Acton was once home to another independent school, Haberdashers' Aske's School for Girls before it changed its site to Elstree, the Acton site becoming the Cardinal Newman Roman Catholic High School. Acton also hosts the King Fahad Academy, an independent Muslim school. This school was previously "Faraday Comprehensive School" having still earlier been "Bromyard Avenue Secondary Modern School". It became one the earliest comprehensive schools under the Harold Wilson government in ca 1962.

International schools

The Japanese School in London is in Acton.

Acton in popular culture

 The 1971 film Villain starring Richard Burton and Ian McShane clearly features Acton Central railway station in one of its sequences. Similarly another sequence in the same film shows the characters Danny and Inspector Matthews talking while on a train which they caught at Acton
Acton was the birthplace of The Who, of which all members except Keith Moon went to Acton County Grammar School, on the site of what is now Ark Acton Academy.
Acton was the location of external shots of the Sunshine Foods office building in The Fall and Rise of Reginald Perrin. The building was located at 32-36 Telford Way but is no longer standing.
Pete Townshend's 1982 solo album, All the Best Cowboys Have Chinese Eyes, contained the track "Stardom in Acton" in reference to his home town, while the accompanying video was filmed on and around Acton High Street.
In the episode of Alan Partridge Towering Alan, the character Mike Sampson is from Acton. He is a socially inept character who describes Acton as having "a few too many blacks."
Leo Sayer's 1983 single Orchard Road refers to Acton's Churchfield Road.
In the TV series Minder, Arthur Daley's car lot was by the railway bridge in The Vale with the door of the Winchester Club in Newburgh Road off Churchfield Road. The lock up was on the Bush Industrial Estate. Minder locations in Acton featured throughout series 7 to 10.
Acton Park often hosted filming for programmes such as Rose & Macaulay and The Deal. Other parts of Acton were used for The Sweeney and early episodes of The Bill.
The first Waitrose store in the UK was in Acton. Originally called "Waite, Rose and Taylor", it opened in 1904, at number 263 Acton Hill.  A metal plate commemorating this has been inserted into the pavement outside these premises as it was not possible to obtain permission from the current owners of the building to affix a plaque onto it.
Scenes from the 1986 movie Aliens and the 1989 movie Batman were shot inside the disused Acton Lane Power Station.
The Ken Loach film Ladybird Ladybird was filmed at many sites around Acton including The Mount, the Town Hall, Vyner Road, Cumberland Park and parts of South Acton.
 Playwright/Composer Lionel Bart lived the latter part of his life in an apartment on Churchfield Road.
The film Frequently Asked Questions About Time Travel (2009) was partly set in the Talbot pub on Mill Hill road, Acton.
 Many scenes of TV series Silent Witness are filmed around Acton and Park Royal. Silent Witness's production offices and sets are at BBC Park Western in North Acton.
 The TV series Motherland used locations in Acton and Chiswick including Southfield Primary School, Southfield Park (episode Good Job Series 2) and Acton Park (Christmas Special 2020).

Notable people 
Mathangi Arulpragasam, rapper and activist, known by her stage name M.I.A. (acronymous for Missing In Acton), grew up in the town, which is referenced numerous times in her lyrics.
 Peter Ackroyd, writer, grew up in East Acton
Henry Charles Brewer (1866 - 1950), early 20th century artist, lived on Perryn Road, Acton until his death, and is buried in Acton Cemetery.
James Alphege Brewer (1881-1946), creator of etchings, lived on Avenue Road, and is buried in Acton Cemetery.
 Karl Dallas, music journalist and peace campaigner, was born and lived in Acton
 Jamal Edwards, founder of SB.TV grew up on the South Acton estate
 John Entwistle, musician, was brought up and went to school in Acton
Adam Faith, singer, actor and financial journalist was born and grew up in Acton.
 Emilia Fox, actor, lives in Acton.
 Kit Harington, actor, was born in Acton
Bill Owen, actor best known for starring as Compo in the BBC's Last of the Summer Wine was born in Acton
Simon Reeves, TV presenter, grew up in Acton.
 Hannah Reid, lead singer of London Grammar grew up in Acton
 Alan Rickman, actor, lived in Acton
 Mark Smith, bodybuilder and actor, who starred as 'Rhino' in Gladiators
 Pete Townshend, musician, grew up and attended school in Acton
 Alan Wilder, former member of the band Depeche Mode was born and raised in Acton
 Robin Friday, former footballer, was born and lived in Acton.
 Robert Spall, recipient of the Victoria Cross was born in Spencer Road, Acton.
 Asma al-Assad, First Lady of Syria, grew up in Acton.

Transport

Tube/Rail
Stations in the area are:
 Acton Central railway station (London Overground and North London Line)
 Acton Main Line railway station (Elizabeth line)
 Acton Town Underground station (District line and Piccadilly line)
 East Acton Underground station (Central line)
 North Acton Underground station (Central line)
 South Acton railway station (North London Line, and formerly District line)
 West Acton Underground station [Central line (Ealing Broadway branch)]

Acton has seven railway stations bearing its name, more than any other place in the United Kingdom other than London itself. Acton is also the only place in London to have stations named after all four of its cardinal points, north, south, east, and west. The widespread provision of train services reflects a long railway history, particularly associated (historically) with London Transport and the Great Western Railway. Between 1858 and 1864 there was a further station on the North London Railway, Acton Junction, where the line to Hammersmith & Chiswick railway station branched off.

North Acton has a large Great Western Railway housing estate (now privately owned), and the Old Oak Common TMD railway depot is within the usual boundary, as is the London Transport Museum Depot which houses an extensive collection of historic and heritage rolling stock. Acton Main Line station has a busy freight yard (operating ballast and container trains).

Buses
London Buses routes 7, 70, 72, 94, 95, 207, 218, 228, 260, 266, 272, 283, 306, 427, 440, 487, 607, E3, N7, N11 and N207 serve Acton.

Shelved tram proposals
Transport for London, led by then Mayor of London, Ken Livingstone, proposed to build a West London Tram between Shepherd's Bush and Uxbridge town centre. It would have run along the A4020, the Uxbridge Road, through Acton, Ealing, West Ealing, Hanwell, Southall and Hayes End. This proposed scheme was highly controversial and resulted in strong differences in opinion between TfL, who supported the scheme, and local councils throughout the proposed route, who all took a 'no tram' stance.

The West London Tram was finally scrapped when former Prime Minister Gordon Brown agreed that the long-awaited Crossrail would go ahead in October 2007. Acton Main Line railway station is to be part of the Crossrail network once it is completed, with 4 trains an hour servicing each route.

Neighbouring places
 Chiswick
 Ealing
 Harlesden
 Park Royal
 Shepherd's Bush
 North Acton
 South Acton
 East Acton
 West Acton

Gallery

See also
Murder of Jean Bradley – notorious event in Acton in 1993

References

External links

British History Online - Acton
ActonW3.com - a digital local newspaper for the area

 
Districts of the London Borough of Ealing
Areas of London
Spa towns in England
Places formerly in Middlesex
District centres of London